Atcheson is a surname of Anglo-Scottish origin. Notable people with this surname:

 (1896–1947), an American diplomat to Japan after WWII, the Chairman of the Allied Council for Japan
Randall Atcheson, an American concert pianist
Sheree Atcheson (born 1991), a Sri Lankan-Irish computer scientist
William Atcheson Traill (1844–1933), a politician in Ontario, Canada

See also
Atchison (disambiguation)
Acheson (disambiguation)

References